Fragment of an Empire is a 1929 Soviet silent drama film directed by Fridrikh Ermler.

Plot 
A soldier called Filimonov lost his memory due to shell shock during the Russian Civil War. In 1928 he sees a woman in a passing train, and suddenly remembers his own history. He decides to leave for his hometown, St. Petersburg, now renamed to Leningrad. He is confused by the rapid changes in modern Leningrad and gets a job at his old workplace, where he slowly realises what it means that peasants are now in charge of the factory. His co-workers find the new address of his wife and send him there. Filimonov is confronted by the fact that his wife is now married to a Soviet apparatchik who treats her badly. In the final scene, Filimonov breaks the fourth wall and declares to the audience that there is still a lot of work to be done.

Restoration 
The movie was restored in 2018 by an international team of silent movie experts, including San Francisco Silent Film Festival board president Robert Byrne and Peter Bagrov, a former archivist from the Russian Gosfilmofond. The restoration was primarily based on a 35mm print from the EYE Filmmuseum in Amsterdam, the Netherlands. A couple of missing shots and intertitles were taken from a print sourced from the Swiss Cinémathèque. Crucially, the scene where Jesus on the crucifix is shown with a gas mask was inserted again. A new soundtrack was composed for the Dutch premiere at the EYE Filmmuseum by Colin Benders, using a Eurorack modular synthesizer.

Cast
Fyodor Nikitin as Filimonov
Yakov Gudkin as The wounded soldier
Lyudmila Semyonova as Filimonov's wife
Valeri Solovtsov as Filimonov's wife's new husband
Emil Gal as Passenger in the train
 Sergei Gerasimov
 Ursula Krug
 Varvara Myasnikova
Vyacheslav Viskovsky as Former Employer
 Aleksandr Melnikov as Member of the Komsomol

References

Bibliography 
 Christie, Ian & Taylor, Richard. The Film Factory: Russian and Soviet Cinema in Documents 1896–1939. Routledge, 2012.

External links 
 

Films directed by Fridrikh Ermler
1929 films
1929 drama films
Soviet drama films
Soviet silent feature films
1920s Russian-language films
Silent drama films